Tenable is a British game show presented by Warwick Davis and briefly Sally Lindsay, airing on ITV since 14 November 2016. On each episode, five contestants attempt to win up to £125,000 by filling in lists of 10 items each. A celebrity version, Tenable All Stars, aired sporadically in 2019.

Gameplay
The five contestants, who have a prior relationship, play the game as a team; one is designated as the captain. The goal in each round is to give as many answers as possible out of 10 in a factual list that fits a particular category, such as "The 10 'TAN' countries" (countries whose names in English include the letter sequence TAN) or "The first 10 James Bond films." Money accumulates in each of the first five rounds according to the table below.

Rounds 1 to 4
After hearing the category for a round, the captain designates one teammate to play it. Each teammate may only play one round and may not confer with anyone else.

The contestant must give at least five correct ("tenable") answers in order to qualify for the Final, and may stop after any correct answer at or beyond this point and bank any money earned. If the contestant completes the list, they automatically advance and bank the money. Correct answers are displayed on a board as they are given, and each round ends with the revelation of any not given.

For most questions, the host provides a brief explanation of what answers can and cannot be accepted as correct. As of the 2020 Christmas special, some rounds begin with a list of 10 clues displayed on the board, one for each of the required answers. If a contestant's answer is correct, it is shown in place of its corresponding clue.

Two forms of assistance are available until the fifth correct answer has been given:

 Nominate: The contestant may choose one teammate to provide an answer, then either accept or reject it at their discretion. May be used up to three times over the entire game.
 Overrule: The captain may reject an answer they believe to be incorrect and give a different one in its place. The contestant's answer is tested first; if it is correct, they are not credited with that answer or awarded any money. May be used only once per round.

The contestant is also given one life, which allows them to continue without penalty at any time after giving an incorrect answer or being overruled in favour of one given by the captain. A second such mistake ends the round immediately, eliminates the contestant from the game and forfeits any money earned during the round.

Round 5
The captain plays this round under the same rules as the first four, with the following changes.

 The overrule option is removed from play.
 After any correct answer that awards money, the captain may choose to reinstate one eliminated teammate in exchange for dropping back one level on the money ladder.
 Reinstated teammates only advance to the Final if the captain completes the list or chooses to stop. 
 Regardless of the outcome, the captain advances to the Final.
 At the end of this round, any teammates who have not been reinstated are permanently eliminated from the game.

Final
The remaining contestants/full team select one of two categories and are given a list pertaining to their choice. They must give one answer at a time, starting with the captain and then proceeding through any others in the order that they played the first four rounds. Nominates and overrules are no longer in play and no conferring is allowed. Any contestant who gives an incorrect answer is immediately eliminated from the game. If the team completes the list, they win all the money they banked in the first five rounds; otherwise, they forfeit all the money and leave with nothing. If a team fails to bank any money in Rounds 1 to 5, the Final is played for a default prize of £500. As of Series 6, if a team loses in the final, each member receives a show-branded tea towel as a consolation prize. The maximum potential jackpot is £125,000 by banking the full £25,000 in each of Rounds 1 to 5.

In the All-Stars version, the celebrities receive £1,000 for their charities if they fail to complete the final list. In the 2019 Christmas special, they receive £2,500 for their charities.

Transmissions

Regular

All-Stars

Specials

References

External links
 
 
 

2016 British television series debuts
2010s British game shows
2020s British game shows
English-language television shows
ITV game shows
Television series by Banijay
Television shows shot at BBC Elstree Centre